Michele Gino Regolo (born 17 August 1978 in Fermo) is an Italian sailor. He competed at the 2012 Summer Olympics in the Men's Laser class finishing in 35th place.

References

External links
 
 
 

1978 births
Living people
Italian male sailors (sport)
Olympic sailors of Italy
Sailors at the 2012 Summer Olympics – Laser